{{Infobox election
| election_name = 2004 United States Senate election in Alabama
| country = Alabama
| type = presidential
| ongoing = no
| previous_election = 1998 United States Senate election in Alabama
| previous_year = 1998
| next_election = 2010 United States Senate election in Alabama
| next_year = 2010
| election_date = November 2, 2004
| image1 = 
| nominee1 = Richard Shelby
| party1 = Republican Party (United States)
| popular_vote1 = 1,242,200
| percentage1 = 67.5%
| image2 = 3x4.svg
| nominee2 = Wayne Sowell
| party2 = Democratic Party (United States)
| popular_vote2 = 595,018
| percentage2 = 32.4%
| map_image = 2004 United States Senate election in Alabama results map by county.svg
| map_size = 250px
| map_caption = County resultsShelby:     Sowell:   
| title = U.S. Senator
| before_election = Richard Shelby
| before_party = Republican Party (United States)
| after_election = Richard Shelby
| after_party = Republican Party (United States)
}}

The 2004 United States Senate election in Alabama''' took place on November 2, 2004, alongside other elections to the United States Senate in other states as well as elections to the United States House of Representatives and various state and local elections. Incumbent Republican U.S. Senator Richard Shelby won re-election to a fourth term.

Candidates

Republican 
 Richard Shelby, incumbent U.S. Senator since 1987

Democratic 
 Wayne Sowell, perennial candidate

General election

Campaign 
Shelby, who switched parties ten years prior, had over $11 million cash on hand. Shelby was Chairman of the Banking Committee. Wayne Sowell became the first black U.S. Senate nominee of a major party in Alabama.

Predictions

Results

See also 
 2004 United States Senate elections

References 

2004 Alabama elections
Alabama
2004